Joanna Janét (born in Baton Rouge, Louisiana) is an American country music singer. Janét was signed to DreamWorks Nashville and recorded an album for the label, Destination Love, that was scheduled to be released in August 2002. The first single from the album, "Since I've Seen You Last," peaked at number 55 on the Billboard Hot Country Singles & Tracks chart. When Janét's producer, Paul Worley, left DreamWorks for Warner Bros. Records, she went with him.

Discography

Singles

Music videos

References

American women country singers
American country singer-songwriters
Living people
Musicians from Baton Rouge, Louisiana
DreamWorks Records artists
Warner Records artists
Singer-songwriters from Louisiana
Country musicians from Louisiana
Year of birth missing (living people)
21st-century American women